810 Seventh Avenue is a Class-A office skyscraper located a few blocks north of Times Square on Seventh Avenue between 52nd and 53rd streets within Midtown Manhattan in New York City, United States. It is owned by SL Green Realty Corp. after its acquisition of Reckson Associates Realty Corp., completed in January 2007. The back of the building is situated on Broadway, diagonally across Broadway and 53rd from CBS's Ed Sullivan Theater, home of The Late Show with Stephen Colbert.

The building has a large number of tenants, including: AT&T Wireless, Aegis Capital Corp., CompassRock Real Estate (40th Floor), Constellation Energy, EMI Entertainment,  Scripps Networks - Ion Media Networks, Hearst Communications, IAC/InterActiveCorp, Insight Communications, The Raine Group, Metromedia Company, Murex, Oppenheimer & Co.,  TheMarkets.com (6th Floor), Pixafy

Other details
 41 stories, 26 units
 Office area: 
 Retail area: 
 Garage area: 
 LEED Certification

References

1969 establishments in New York City
Office buildings completed in 1969
Skyscraper office buildings in Manhattan
Seventh Avenue (Manhattan)
Times Square buildings
Leadership in Energy and Environmental Design certified buildings